The Normal Christian Life is a book by Watchman Nee first delivered as a series of addresses to Christian workers who were gathered in Denmark for special meetings in 1938 and 1939. The messages were first published chapter by chapter in the magazine A Witness and A Testimony published by Theodore Austin-Sparks. The first chapter was published in the November–December 1940 issue. This first publication of the book can be viewed in the original magazines on Austin-Sparks.Net. The messages were later compiled into a book by Angus Kinnear in 1957 in Bombay, India.

In The Normal Christian Life, Watchman Nee presents foundational principles for the Christian life and walk drawing primarily from the book of Romans. The book is generally regarded by many as the first introduction of Watchman Nee to the Western world. As of 2009, this book has sold over 1 million copies and is available in many editions and languages.

Subject

Watchman Nee based his speaking on the first eight chapters of the New Testament book of Romans. Nee takes the first eight chapters of Romans as a "self-contained unit" and divides these chapters into two parts: Romans 1:1 to 5:11 as part one and Romans 5:12 to 8:39 as part two. In the first part of Romans "sins" is given prominent attention and deals with the question of the sins man has committed before God. However, the second section deals with "sin," that is the inward nature, or inward working principle, within man that causes man to commit sin. Thus there is a difference between the acts of a sinner, sins, and the inward nature of a sinner, sin. Nee reveals that God's dual remedy is the Blood of the Lord Jesus Christ and the Cross of Christ. The Blood "deals with what we have done, whereas the Cross deals with what we are. The Blood disposes of our sins, while the Cross strikes at the root of our capacity for sin". As Nee progressively moves along in his book, he first touches upon the Blood and then focuses upon the Cross for the remainder of the book.[1]

Four Steps of the Cross
Watchman Nee gave four steps in which a Christian lives the Christian life. Basing from Romans 6:6, there is the need for the knowledge of the cross of Christ as a fact in our experience.

The second step is the matter of reckoning. Reckoning is the stating and considering of facts and promises that God has revealed to be true.

The third step is the matter of presenting to God. Coming to Romans 6:13, Watchman Nee says that Christians consecrate that which passed through death and resurrection in the new creation. In this way, Christians would no longer live to themselves but to Christ because He has the full authority over their lives.

The fourth step is the matter of Walking after the Spirit. Firstly, walking after the Spirit does not refer to our "working" but of dependence on God's working and operation. Secondly, it refers to subjection. This means that the Christian life is the yielding of all the dictates of our flesh and be of subjection to the Spirit.

Influence

The Normal Christian Life is one of Nee's most well known books. It is considered by many to be a spiritual classic of Christianity. It has been reprinted and reissued in many editions and in many languages. The book's enduring appeal is not only due to Nee's exposition of Romans but also to the many illustrations, personal accounts, and anecdotes that Nee used. The Normal Christian Life has impacted millions of Christians since Nee spoke it and is a major contributor to the local churches movement today. Nee was recognized in the United States House of Representatives by Christopher H. Smith of New Jersey in 2009. He recognized Nee as having been one of the most influential Chinese Christians of his era. In the Congressional record, The Normal Christian Life is highlighted by Smith as being among his most popular and influential books.

Contents

Preface

Preface to the English Edition

Introduction
Chapter 1: The Blood of Christ
Chapter 2: The Cross of Christ
Chapter 3: The Path of Progress: Knowing
Chapter 4: The Path of Progress: Reckoning
Chapter 5: The Divide of the Cross
Chapter 6: The Path of Progress: Presenting Ourselves to God
Chapter 7: The Eternal Purpose
Chapter 8: The Holy Spirit
Chapter 9: The Meaning and Value of Romans Seven
Chapter 10: The Path of Progress: Walking in the Spirit
Chapter 11: One Body in Christ
Chapter 12: The Cross and the Soul Life
Chapter 13: The Path of Progress: Bearing the Cross
Chapter 14: The Goal of the Gospel

Editions of The Normal Christian Life

There have been many editions of The Normal Christian Life throughout the years. The very first edition of the book was published in 1957 by Gospel Literature Service in Bombay, India, preceded by the publication of 9 of the messages in the A Witness and A Testimony magazines in 1940-42. Many editions were to follow:

Paperback published June 28, 1979 by Christian Literature Crusade
Paperback published December 9, 1997 by Tyndale House Publishers
Hardcover published July 1, 2000 by Barbour Publishing
Audio cassette published August 1, 2001 by Living Stream Ministry
Audio CD published August 1, 2001 by Living Stream Ministry
Paperback published October 1, 2005 by Kingsway Publications
Hardcover published February 1, 2006 by Hendrickson Publishers
Audio CD published June 1, 2006 Hovel Audio
Paperback published May 29, 2008 by Wilder Publications
Paperback published January 10, 2009 by CLC Publications
ebook published January 13, 2009 by CLC Publications
ebook published November 4, 2010 by Watchman Books
ebook published October 28, 2010 by New Century Books
Kindle Edition published April 7, 2011 by New Century books
ebooks published April 8, 2011 by Century Books
Paperback published 2012 by Living Stream Ministry

References

External links
 Online text – Christian Classics Ethereal Library
 Order a free copy of The Normal Christian Life
 A Witness and A Testimony magazines online
 
 

Books about Christianity
20th-century Christian texts